Bruce Henderson may refer to:

 Bruce Henderson (1915–1992), American entrepreneur
 Bruce Henderson (author) (born 1946), American journalist and writer
 Bruce Henderson (philatelist) (born 1950), New Zealand anarchist and hoaxer